Verafin Inc. is a fraud detection technology and anti-money laundering software subsidiary of Nasdaq, Inc. based in St. John's, Newfoundland and Labrador, Canada. The company was established in 2003 by Brendan Brothers, Jamie King, and Raymond Pretty.

Growth and development
More than 1,200 credit unions in the United States use Verafin to effectively fight financial crime. In July 2012, Verafin employed around 130 employees at their St. John's headquarters and Birmingham, Alabama office. It's reported that the company serves around 2,000 clients - mostly small and medium-size banks. On November 19, 2020, Nasdaq, Inc. announced a deal to buy the company for US$2.75 billion, promising to maintain Verafin's existing headquarters in St. John's. The deal was completed in February 2021.

Awards and recognition
 2011: Atlantic Business Magazine named Verafin President and CEO Jamie King in its Top 50 CEOs list.
 June 2012: Verafin was awarded the Exporter of the Year award by the Government of Newfoundland & Labrador’s Department of Innovation, Business and Rural Development.
 Atlantic Business Magazine named Verafin President and CEO Jamie King for the second time in its Top 50 CEOs list.

References

External links
 

Financial technology companies
Financial services companies of Canada
Companies based in St. John's, Newfoundland and Labrador
Canadian companies established in 2003
Financial services companies established in 2003
2021 mergers and acquisitions
Nasdaq, Inc.
Canadian subsidiaries of foreign companies